Péricles Santos Pereira (born 10 April 1993), commonly known as Pecks, is a Cape Verdean professional footballer who plays for Portuguese club S.C. Salgueiros as a central defender.

He began his professional career at Gil Vicente in the Primeira Liga, making 82 appearances in all. After missing two years due to bureaucratic issues in his country, he returned to Portugal in 2019 to play in the lower divisions for several clubs.

Capped four times by Cape Verde, Pecks was part of their squad for the 2013 Africa Cup of Nations.

Club career
Born in Mindelo on the island of São Vicente, Pecks began his career with local Batuque FC, before joining Gil Vicente F.C. in Portugal in 2011. After a year in the youth team, he made his Primeira Liga debut on 19 August 2012 as the season opened with a goalless draw at home against FC Porto; he came on as an 87th-minute substitute for Luís Carlos Lima. In his next game on 18 November, he played the full 120 minutes and scored to open a 2–1 away win at SC Mirandela in the fourth round of the Taça de Portugal.

Pecks scored a first top-flight goal on 6 October 2013, having come off the bench in a 2–1 victory over F.C. Paços de Ferreira at the Estádio Cidade de Barcelos. Just over two months later, he was sent off for a foul on William Carvalho in a 2–0 loss to Sporting CP at the same venue. On 13 January 2016, he scored the only goal against visitors C.D. Nacional to put his team into the semi-finals of the national cup for only the second time after 1971–72.

In June 2016, after an international game away to São Tomé and Príncipe, Pecks was caught up in bureaucratic issues in his homeland, leaving him stranded and sitting out his final season as a Gilista. He kept up practice in futsal and beach soccer with friends before resuming his career with G.D.R. Celtic in the capital, Praia.

Free to return to Portugal, Pecks signed for F.C. Pedras Rubras of the third division in 2019. He remained playing at that level for Leça FC, Valadares Gaia FC and S.C. Salgueiros.

International career
Having made his international debut on 14 November 2012 as a substitute in a 1–0 friendly loss to Ghana in Lisbon, Pecks was chosen for the 2013 Africa Cup of Nations in South Africa, Cape Verde's debut in the competition. He was unused in a run to the quarter-finals.

Pecks made three more appearances, each in a different year, ending with the aforementioned trip to São Tomé and Príncipe.

References

External links

1993 births
Living people
People from Mindelo
Cape Verdean footballers
Association football defenders
Batuque FC players
Primeira Liga players
Liga Portugal 2 players
Campeonato de Portugal (league) players
Gil Vicente F.C. players
F.C. Pedras Rubras players
Leça F.C. players
S.C. Salgueiros players
Cape Verde international footballers
2013 Africa Cup of Nations players
Cape Verdean expatriate footballers
Expatriate footballers in Portugal
Cape Verdean expatriate sportspeople in Portugal